Menachem ben Peretz of Hebron (or Menachem ben R. Peretz of Hebron, or Menachen ben Peretz; Hebrew: מנחם החברוני, pronounced: Menachem ha-Hevroni, lit. Menachem of Hebron) is the alleged-name of a French Jew who spent several years in Hebron in the first quarter of the 13th century.  He is described as a writer of an epistle, in which, among other things, he documented the tradition of identification of Jewish holy sites in the Land of Israel, sites which he got to know from his conversations with Jewish inhabitants of the Land of Israel during his years of residence and travels there.

Content 

The treatise which contains the epistle attributed to him is made of two parts: The first part, a kind of travelogue, depicting a pilgrimage to various sites in the Land of Israel, and the second part is full of fiction stories. The second part describes Menachem as prayer leader for eight years in Hebron, and specifies a date: Tammuz, ד'תתקע"ה (1215)

The depiction of the journey begins in Hebron, where the author visited the tombs of ancestors; he then continued to the tomb of the prophet Jonah, in Halhul, and from there he proceeded to Rachel's Tomb in Bethlehem. From there he turns to Jerusalem, where he stayed and prayed in the presence of a large Jewish community. In Mount Zion he saw the Tombs of the Kings and was also able to see the location of the Holy Temple and the fact that the Western Wall "Still exists". From the Mount of Olives he looked out on the altar built by Ezra, and in the Valley of Josaphat he saw the Tomb of Zechariah "Who was a priest and a prophet" and the Tomb of Absalom. From that point on the journey becomes confused, and the names of the sites listed in it are not arranged in any logical order. In addition, various sites are not in the place known today. For example, he locates the tomb of Simeon bar Yochai at Kfar Hananya, and the tomb of Dinah, where the rest of the pilgrims place at Mount Arbel, he places near Nablus.

The second section of the travelogue is a collection of legends, each one starting with the opening sentence: "And R. Menachem ben Peretz told us more"

Adolf Neubauer was the first to publish the essay in ha-Levanon paper (V, 40, 1868, p. 626-629), and Abraham Moses Luncz thereafter published it in Ha- Me'amer (III, 1919, p. 36-46).

Credibility
Scholars are divided on the question of the authenticity and the letter's reliability. The manuscript is found in Oxford's Bodleian Library MS Bodl. Or. 135. Samuel Klein  saw it as a 19th-century forgery, but Isaiah Sonne maintained it to be  an ancient manuscript of the 14th century, and Professor Malachi Beit-Arié came to the conclusion that the description of the journey, as well as the entire codex which is in the letter, were written at the beginning of the 13th century. In Joshua Prawer's opinion, the letter is a fake, but this is not the work of an author of the 19th century but rather a forger of the 13th century. In his opinion it is a failed fake that uses the descriptive passages of journeys of others, journeys that were perhaps already widespread in the Western Diaspora. In contrast, Elhanan Reiner sees the letter as "reliable, accurate and interesting".

The author himself apparently feared he would be suspected of improper motives, and so he writes in his letter:

See also
Joseph's Tomb
Simeon Shezuri

References

External links
Letter of R. Menahem of Hebron, in Ha- Me'amer, edited by Abraham Moses Luncz, Jerusalem, 1969 (Hebrew)

Holy Land travellers
Medieval Jewish travel writers
People from Hebron
Pilgrimage accounts
13th-century French Jews
13th-century French writers
French male writers